Carex michauxiana, also known as Michaux's sedge, carex de Michaux or yellowish sedge in Canada, is a tussock-forming species of perennial sedge in the family Cyperaceae. It is native to eastern parts of North America and parts of Asia.

Description
The yellowish to grenn leaves form from a thin outgrowth at the junction of leafstalk (a ligule).

Taxonomy
The species was first formally described by the botanist Johann Otto Boeckeler in 1877 as a part of the work Linnaea.. It has three synonyms;
 Carex rostrata Michx. 
 Carex xanthophysa var. minor Dewey 
 Carex xanthophysa var. nana Dewey.
There are also two recognised subspecies;
 Carex michauxiana subsp. asiatica Hultén
 Carex michauxiana subsp. michauxiana.
It is closely related to Carex dolichocarpa, which is found in Asia.

Distribution
The plant is found in mostly in temperate biomes across the Northern hemisphere. In North America it is found from Saskatchewan in the north west to Newfoundland in the north east down to Minnesota in the south east and New York in the south east. In Asia it is found in far eastern Russia in Kamchatka extending south through Japan and north eastern China. It is also found in New Guinea.

See also
List of Carex species

References

michauxiana
Taxa named by Johann Otto Boeckeler
Plants described in 1877
Flora of China
Flora of Japan
Flora of Kamchatka Krai
Flora of Labrador
Flora of Maine
Flora of Manitoba
Flora of Maryland
Flora of Massachusetts
Flora of Michigan
Flora of Minnesota
Flora of New Brunswick
Flora of New Guinea
Flora of New Hampshire
Flora of New York (state)
Flora of Newfoundland
Flora of Nova Scotia
Flora of Ontario
Flora of Quebec
Flora of Vermont
Flora of Wisconsin
Flora of Saskatchewan